Crocidophora elongalis is a moth in the family Crambidae. It was described by Viette in 1978. It is found in Madagascar and on the Comoros.

References

Moths described in 1978
Pyraustinae